Cecilio Alfonso Waterman Ruiz (born 13 April 1991) is a Panamanian professional footballer who plays as a striker for Everton and the Panama national team.

Club career
Waterman made his professional debut playing with Sporting San Miguelito on 26 September 2010 against Atlético Chiriquí.

In mid 2011 he was transferred to Uruguayan side Centro Atlético Fénix, for whom he scored his first goal in May 2012 against Racing.

International career
Waterman was part of the Panama U-20 squad for the 2011 CONCACAF U-20 Championship where he scored four goals helping his country qualify to the Youth World Cup in Colombia.

He made his senior debut for Panama in a December 2010 friendly match against Honduras and has, as of 15 August 2015, earned a total of 7 caps, scoring no goals. In 2013, he was called up by Julio Dely Valdés to play the 2013 CONCACAF Gold Cup.

Career statistics

Club

International

Scores and results list Panama's goal tally first, score column indicates score after each Waterman goal.

References

External links
 
 

1991 births
Living people
Sportspeople from Panama City
Association football wingers
Panamanian footballers
Sporting San Miguelito players
Centro Atlético Fénix players
Defensor Sporting players
Club Plaza Colonia de Deportes players
Universidad de Concepción footballers
Liga Panameña de Fútbol players
Uruguayan Primera División players
Ascenso MX players
Panama youth international footballers
Pan American Games competitors for Panama
Chilean Primera División players
Panama international footballers
Panamanian expatriate footballers
Expatriate footballers in Uruguay
Expatriate footballers in Mexico
Expatriate footballers in Chile
Panamanian expatriate sportspeople in Uruguay
Panamanian expatriate sportspeople in Mexico
Panamanian expatriate sportspeople in Chile
2013 CONCACAF Gold Cup players
Footballers at the 2015 Pan American Games